A by-election was held for the Sarawak State Assembly seat of Balingian on 29 March 2014 following the nomination day on 17 March 2014. The incumbent assemblyman and former 33-year Chief Minister, Abdul Taib Mahmud resigned from his post on 28 February 2014. The seat was declared vacant after he took his seat as the new Yang di-Pertua Negeri of Sarawak, succeeding Abang Muhammad Salahuddin whose term ended on 28 February. Taib was an assemblyman from the Parti Pesaka Bumiputera Bersatu, a component party of Barisan Nasional. The former chairman of the party, he won by a majority of 5,154 votes against 2 other candidates in the 2011 election.

The election saw a straight fight between Pakatan Rakyat and Barisan Nasional. Yussibnosh Balo represented Parti Pesaka Bumiputera Bersatu while Abdul Jalil Bujang represented Parti Keadilan Rakyat, a component party of Pakatan Rakyat. The by-election campaign was marred by allegations that Chief Minister Adenan Satem abused his power when 4 PKR leaders were barred from entering Sarawak during the campaign period.

Yussibnosh Balo retained the very safe BN seat by a majority of 6,911 votes.

Results

References 

Politics of Sarawak
2014 elections in Malaysia
2014 Balingian by-election
Elections in Sarawak